Emanuel Pimenta may refer to:

 Emanuel Dimas de Melo Pimenta (born 1957), Brazilian musician, architect, and intermedia artist
 Emanuel Eduardo Pimenta Vieira Silva (born 1985), Portuguese flatwater canoer